"Right Here" is the first single from Staind's fifth album Chapter V in 2005.

"Right Here" has been Staind's third-most successful single chartwise (the first two being 2001's "It's Been Awhile" and 2003's "So Far Away"), peaking at No. 1 on the Billboard Hot Mainstream Rock Tracks chart, as the previous two singles had also done. The two previous singles also hit No. 1 on the Hot Modern Rock Tracks chart but "Right Here" failed to accomplish this feat. but it still was successful peaking at No. 3. It is band's second-most successful single on the U.S. pop and adult contemporary charts unexpectedly charting higher than "So Far Away" which charted higher on most charts but only behind "It's Been Awhile" leading "Right Here" to peak No. 7 on the Adult Top 40 and No. 9 on the Mainstream Top 40 chart. It is also Staind's first entry into the Hot Adult Contemporary Tracks (No. 40) and the Hot Digital Songs charts (No. 39). The song was also used in a video package by World Wrestling Entertainment commemorating wrestler Edge after he won his first WWE Championship.

Music video
The music video features all four members in one house in four separate rooms. Cameras capture all the members except Aaron Lewis in the same room playing their instruments, while Lewis is featured in multiple rooms.

Track listing

"Right Here"
"Open Wide" (Non-Album Track)
"Come Again" (Demo)

Charts

Weekly charts

Year-end charts

Certifications

References

Staind songs
2005 singles
Songs written by Aaron Lewis
Song recordings produced by David Bottrill
2005 songs
Songs written by Mike Mushok
Flip Records (1994) singles